Michael Rohl is a Canadian TV director and producer. He is of Volga German and Ukrainian descent. He has worked on Shadowhunters, Smallville, Supernatural, Terminator: The Sarah Connor Chronicles, Andromeda, Kyle XY, and Reaper as well as many other programs. He and ex-wife, writer Jan Derbyshire, have a daughter, actress Kacey Rohl.

Partial filmography
 The Princess Switch 3: Romancing the Star (2021)
 The Princess Switch: Switched Again (2020)
 The Princess Switch (2018)
 Shadowhunters (TV series) (2017-2019)
 When Calls the Heart (2015-2021)
 Helix (TV series) (2013)
 Primeval: New World (TV series) (2012)
 Continuum (2012)
 Haven (TV series) (2010)
 Defying Gravity (2009)
 Impact TV miniseries (2009)
 Angela's Eyes (TV series) (2007)
 Reaper (2007)
 Supernatural (2006-2012)
 Smallville (2006–2011)
 Kyle XY (TV series) (2006)
 Andromeda (2002)
 The Outer Limits (1999-2000)
 Snowbound: The Jim and Jennifer Stolpa Story (Made for TV movie) (1994)

References

External links
 https://www.mikerohl.com/

American film directors
American television directors
Living people
Place of birth missing (living people)
Year of birth missing (living people)